Suhor is a small settlement west of the town of Novo Mesto in southeastern Slovenia. The entire City Municipality of Novo Mesto is part of the traditional region of Lower Carniola and is now included in the Southeast Slovenia Statistical Region.

References

External links
Suhor on Geopedia

Populated places in the City Municipality of Novo Mesto